Dryville is a census-designated place in Rockland Township, Berks County, Pennsylvania, United States.  It is located one mile south of Lyons, and is located in the South Mountains and is drained by Bieber Creek into Manatawny Creek, a tributary of the Schuylkill River. It is split between the Fleetwood zip code of 19522 and the Mertztown zip code of 19539. As of the 2010 census, the population was 398 residents.

Demographics

History
The village grew around the Henry Mertz Lutheran Church, which opened in 1747. Dryville was named in 1852 after Benjamin Dry, a local postmaster.

References

External links
 Dryville Hotel

Census-designated places in Berks County, Pennsylvania
Census-designated places in Pennsylvania